George Cottrell (born 1 October 1993) is a British financier and convicted felon. He was a senior advisor to Nigel Farage and served as head of fundraising for the UK Independence Party (UKIP) until his arrest in the USA following the 2016 Republican National Convention.

Early life and family
Cottrell was born in London, England, to an aristocratic family. His father, Mark Cottrell, a businessman and landowner from Gloucestershire attended Gordonstoun School with Prince Andrew, Duke of York. George Cottrell's mother, The Honourable Fiona Watson, a daughter of Rupert Watson, 3rd Baron Manton (d.2003), is a former glamour model and girlfriend of Charles, Prince of Wales.

Cottrell's maternal uncle Alexander Fermor-Hesketh, 3rd Baron Hesketh was the Government Chief Whip in the House of Lords and served as Treasurer of the  Conservative Party but later defected to the UK Independence Party (UKIP) in 2011.

Cottrell was raised and educated on the private island of Mustique before attending Malvern College from which he was expelled for illegal gambling.

Career

Cottrell was listed as a director in a number of businesses from a young age, both in the UK and overseas. Starting in 2013 Cottrell assumed a number of roles at banks including Credit Suisse, JP Morgan and Banca Privada d'Andorra (BPA). Following the 2015 UK general election Cottrell was appointed deputy treasurer of the United Kingdom Independence Party (UKIP).

While head of fundraising for UKIP, Cottrell became the chief of staff to Nigel Farage, who was then UKIP leader. When Farage resigned as leader of UKIP, Cottrell continued to run his private office.

Arrest and conviction

On 22 July 2016, while attending the Republican National Convention with Farage, Cottrell was arrested by IRS Criminal Investigation special agents at Chicago O'Hare International. Cottrell was federally indicted on 21 counts for conspiracy to commit money laundering, wire fraud, blackmail and extortion. Denied bail by a judge who branded Cottrell a "serious flight risk" he was detained in custody at Metropolitan Correctional Center, Chicago.

Cottrell's indictment states how in 2014 he met with undercover federal agents in Las Vegas, where he conspired to launder millions of dollars worth of drug money using offshore bank accounts. However, following a plea agreement in December 2016, prosecutors agreed to dismiss 20 counts in return for a guilty plea to a single count of wire fraud in which Cottrell admitted to explaining various ways criminal proceeds could be laundered.

In March 2017, Cottrell was sentenced and released by Judge Diane Humetewa having served eight months in prison.

References

1993 births
Living people
People convicted of money laundering
People educated at Malvern College